Eberhardt Mansion is a historic home located at Kenmore in Erie County, New York.  It is a locally distinctive example of the Neo-Romanesque style of architecture built in 1893 for Frederick Eberhardt, one of two brothers who originally developed Kenmore.  In 1916 the home was purchased by the Wheel Chair Home, Inc., and in 1981 was purchased by coin broker Jack Hunt.

It was listed on the National Register of Historic Places in 1983.

References

External links
Eberhardt Mansion - U.S. National Register of Historic Places on Waymarking.com
The Fred Eberhardt House on buffaloah.com

Houses on the National Register of Historic Places in New York (state)
Houses completed in 1893
Houses in Erie County, New York
National Register of Historic Places in Erie County, New York